Horsburgh may refer to:

Places
Horsburgh Atoll or Goidhoo, inhabited islands of Southern Maalhosmadulhu Atoll
Horsburgh Castle, ruined tower house castle near Glentress in Scotland
Horsburgh Island, one of the Cocos (Keeling) Islands
Horsburgh Lighthouse, lighthouse on Pedra Branca, Singapore, which marks the eastern entrance to the Straits of Singapore
Horsburgh Point, on the southwest side of Montagu Island in the South Sandwich Islands
Nether Horsburgh Castle, ruined tower house near Cardrona, Scotland

Other uses
Horsburgh (surname)
Alexander Horsburgh Turnbull (1868–1918), New Zealand merchant, dandy and book collector